Indialantic (officially incorporated as Indialantic-By-The-Sea, though the official name is seldom used in casual parlance) is a town in Brevard County, Florida. The town's population was 2,720 at the 2010 United States Census. It is part of the Palm Bay–Melbourne–Titusville Metropolitan Statistical Area.

The town's name is a portmanteau derived from the town's location between the Indian River Lagoon and the Atlantic Ocean.

Geography

Indialantic is situated on the barrier island that separates the Indian River Lagoon from the Atlantic Ocean. The Melbourne Causeway connects Indialantic to the city of  Melbourne across the Indian River Lagoon. Indialantic is bordered on the south by the town of Melbourne Beach and on the north by unincorporated Brevard County.

Greater Indialantic

Greater Indialantic, outside the town boundaries, represents a parallel development of suburban beach homes, which for lack of a stronger identity, has assumed that of the nearest town. The Town of Indialantic is a  community. The areas mentioned below are not in town but share a ZIP code with Indialantic.

This area starts with the town of Indialantic on the south and lies between the Atlantic Ocean and the Indian River, extending north just short of the Eau Gallie Causeway (SR 518). It includes mostly unincorporated parts of Brevard County but also includes a development that is part of the city of Melbourne, otherwise a mainland community.

Included are these developments:

 Canova Beach
 Cloisters
 Coventry
 Highland Groves
 Indialantic Heights
 North Atlantic by the Sea
 Ocean Park
 Oceanside Village
 Palm Colony
 Puesta del Sol
 Rio Linda
 Rio Villa
 River Shores
 Riviera
 Sanctuary (part of the City of Melbourne)
 Shady Shores
 Terrace Shores

History

From 1919 to 1921, the Dutchman Ernest Kouwenhoven, who bought the land that ultimately became Indialantic, settled in the area, and built a wooden bridge connecting Indialantic with Melbourne (Bridge #1)

In the 1920s – The Indialantic Hotel was built. Its name was later changed to the Tradewinds Hotel. The hotel was on what is now South Shannon Avenue, the current location of Tradewinds Terrace.

By 1924, the Indialantic Casino was built. Its name was later changed to the Bahama Beach Club. This is the location of Nance Park today.

From 1941 to 1947, the wooden bridge was replaced with a drawbridge, delayed by the war years. (Bridge #2)

In 1952, Indialantic was incorporated with the official (but rarely used in common parlance) name "Indialantic-By-The-Sea".

In 1985, a modern causeway was built with an elevated span to avoid obstructing boats using the Indian River  (Bridge #3)

Demographics

As of the census of 2000, there were 2,944 people, 1,330 households, and 848 families residing in the town. The racial makeup of the town was .627% African American, 47.32% White, 0.14% Native American, 0.71% Asian, 0.58% from other races, and 0.99% from two or more races. Hispanic or Latino of any race were 2.34% of the population.

There were 1,330 households, out of which 21.6% had children under the age of 18 living with them, 54.2% were married couples living together, 7.0% had a female householder with no husband present, and 36.2% were non-families. 27.3% of all households were made up of individuals, and 12.4% had someone living alone who was 65 years of age or older.  The average household size was 2.21 and the average family size was 2.72.

In the town, the population was spread out, with 17.6% under the age of 18, 4.7% from 18 to 24, 26.4% from 25 to 44, 27.3% from 45 to 64, and 24.0% who were 65 years of age or older.  The median age was 46 years. For every 100 females, there were 97.5 males.  For every 100 females age 18 and over, there were 97.4 males.

The median income for a household in the town was $62,181, and the median income for a family was $76,109. Males had a median income of $51,830 versus $30,047 for females. The per capita income for the town was $41,126.  About 1.1% of families and 2.3% of the population were below the poverty line, including none of those under age 18 and 1.9% of those age 65 or over.

The per capita income of $41,126 places the town of Indialantic first in Brevard County and 58 in the state (out of 887 places).

Greater Indialantic

Here are the figures as of the 2000 census for the area with the Zip code 32903:

Total population = 12,792

Gender and age
 Male = 6,339 (49.6%)
 Female = 6,453 (50.4%)
 Median Age = 45.2, above US average of 35.3
 Under 5 years = 583 (4.6%) (US ave = 6.8%)
 18 years and over = 10,361 (81%) (US ave = 74.3%)
 65 years and over = 2,887 (22.6%) (US ave = 12.4%)

Racial characteristics:
 White – 96.4% (US ave - 75.1%)
 Asian – 1.2% (3.6%)
 Two or more races – 1.1% (2.4%)
 Black or Afro-American – .7% (12.3%)
 Another Race – .5% (5.5%)

Households:
 Size – 2.25 (2.59)
 Family size – 2.74 (3.14)

Housing:
 Owner occupied – 78.5% (66.2%)
 Renter occupied – 21.5% (33.8%)
 Vacant housing units – 11.3%  (9.0%)

Social Characteristics:
 High school graduate or higher – 95.2% (80.4%)
 Bachelor's degree or higher – 47.5% (24.4%)
 Veterans – 21.5% (12.7%)
 Disability status (5 years and over) – 15% (19.3%)
 Foreign born – 7.4% (11.1%)
 Male, now married, except separated, (15 years and over) – 61.5% (56.7%)
 Female, now married, except separated, (15 years and over) – 61.1% (52.1%)
 Speak a language other than English at home (5 years and over) – 8.1% (17.9%)

Government

The town publishes a quarterly report to all residents.

Officers are as follows:
Mayor – Mark McDermott (term ends 2024)
Deputy Mayor – Stu Glass (term ends 2024)
Councilmember – Loren Strand (term ends 2024)
Councilmember – Julie McKnight (term ends 2023)
Councilmember – Doug Wright (term ends 2023)

The following are all appointed or hired:
Town Manager – Michael Casey
Police Chief – Michael Connor
Public Works Director – Joe Gervais
Town Attorney – Paul Gougelman
Town Clerk – Rebekah Raddon
Fire Chief – Tom Flamm
Building Official – Clifford Stokes

In 2008, the town had a taxable real estate base of $367.69 million. The budget for fiscal year 2012 was $4,060,999.

Public safety

There are six paid firefighters plus fifteen active volunteers. Since 1985, residents have lit luminaria before Christmas when firemen have distributed candy to children from a firetruck, on every street.

Indialantic maintains a police force with 12 sworn police officers, including the chief of police. On average, officers respond to 4,000 calls for service a year with an approximate response time of under two minutes.

Emergency services are dispatched from the town's communications center, staffed by four full-time and five part-time dispatchers.

Past mayors

John McLean 1952–1954
Louis H. Mussler c. 1954–1958
William Ballinger 1958–1959
Harry Kane 1959–1961
Timothy D. Deratany 1971–1977
Clayton Test 1977–1979
Constantine "Gus" Carey  1979–1981
Andrea Deratany 1981–1984
Gloria Gardner 1984–1985
Barry Kronman 1985–1987
Norbert "Norb" O'Hara 1987–1989
David Lawrence Dean 1989–1992
Bill Vernon 1992–1996
Todd Deratany 1996–1998
Robert Cochran 1998–2002
Daniel Trott 2002–2006
Robert Cochran 2006–2008
David Berkman  2008–2022

Economy

Personal income

2019 Economic characteristics per https://datausa.io/profile/geo/indialantic-fl

 In labor force, 1,228 of total 2,865 population
 Travel time to work, minutes – 24.2%
 Median household income in 1999 dollars – $59,773  ($41,994)
 Media household income – $83,365 (compared to US average of $65,712)
 Families below poverty level – 8.86 (compared to US average of 12.3%)
 Median Home Value - $374,500

EVENTS

The following events occur annually:

 July craft show, Nance Park
 Witch Way 5K run and Halloween Party in Nance Park in October
 Indialantic Boardwalk Sprint Distance Triathlon, June
 Annual Christmas Tree Lighting at Nance Park, December

Education

There are two local schools, both of which lie outside the city boundaries in the adjacent unincorporated part of Indialantic; they are under the jurisdiction of the Brevard County School Board: Indialantic Elementary and Hoover Middle School. The state evaluated Hoover "Grade A" from 2000 to 2008.

In 2005, Hoover contained grades 7 and 8. There were 512 students and 32 teachers, for a ratio of 16:1. 11.3% qualified for free or reduced lunch. Indialantic Elementary contained grades Pre-kindergarten though sixth. There were 812 students and 54 teachers for a ratio of 15:1. 13.3% qualified for free or reduced lunch.

Media

 Florida Today
 The Hometown News is a free weekly paper distributed to each home.

Infrastructure

Roads

Travelocity.com named route A1A, which runs along the Brevard shore, as the "Best Driving Route" in Florida. This runs close to the ocean. A secondary major route, paralleling it, is Riverside, which is close to the Indian River.

The Florida Department of Transportation maintains A1A and 192. Brevard County maintains North Riverside Drive. The town maintains  of roadway.

See State Roads in Florida for explanation of numbering system.

  U.S. Route 192 – "Fifth Avenue"
  SR A1A – Miramar Avenue
 Riverside Drive – 10,000 vehicles used this road daily in 2010. It runs throughout the length of Indialantic including "greater Indialantic" in the county.

Notable people

 Brian Bollinger, NFL player
 Noah Horchler, basketball player for Providence Friars
 Kathy Johnson, gymnast
 Ernest Kouwen-Hoven, businessman
 Robert F. Marx, pioneer scuba diver and author
 Pat Neshek, MLB pitcher for the Philadelphia Phillies
 Stefanie Scott, actress
 John Siptroth, U.S. Politician and public figure

References

External links

Beaches of Brevard County, Florida
Towns in Brevard County, Florida
Populated places established in 1952
Towns in Florida
Populated coastal places in Florida on the Atlantic Ocean
Beaches of Florida
1952 establishments in Florida